San Michele Arcangelo a Pietralata is a 20th-century parochial church and titular church in eastern Rome, dedicated to Michael the Archangel.

History 

San Michele Arcangelo a Pietralata was built in 1937–48; its construction was interrupted by the Second World War. It is built in red-orange brick, with the arms of Pope Pius XII displayed on the facade.

On 5 February 1965, it was made a titular church to be held by a cardinal-deacon.

In 1991 it was visited by Pope John Paul II. In 2015, the church was visited by Pope Francis.

Cardinal-Protectors
Joseph Cardijn (1965–1967)
Javier Lozano Barragán (2003–2014)
Michael Czerny (2019–present)

References

External links

Titular churches
Roman Catholic churches completed in 1948
20th-century Roman Catholic church buildings in Italy
Rome Q. XXI Pietralata